Renze Fij (born 26 September 1992) is a Dutch professional footballer who plays as a goalkeeper for Sogndal.

Club career
He formerly played for Go Ahead Eagles and FC Groningen. During the first half of the 2017-18 season, he played on loan for FC Dordrecht.

On 29 March 2019, he signed for Nest-Sotra on a season-long deal.

On 10 November 2019, he signed for Sogndal on a two year-long deal.

References

External links
 
 Voetbal International profile 
 

1992 births
Living people
Footballers from Enschede
Association football goalkeepers
Dutch footballers
Go Ahead Eagles players
Heracles Almelo players
FC Dordrecht players
Florø SK players
Nest-Sotra Fotball players
Sogndal Fotball players
Eredivisie players
Eerste Divisie players
Norwegian Second Division players
Norwegian First Division players
Expatriate footballers in Norway
Dutch expatriate sportspeople in Norway
Dutch expatriate footballers